The Kneeling Bull With Vessel is a small 6 3/8 inches (16.3 cm) tall statue made of silver with an animal upper part of a bull holding a vessel with pebbles inside and a lower part shaped in the body of a kneeling human wearing a patterned article of clothing. The artist is unknown, and it is also not known if it has any spiritual connotations. Art such as this show vigorously developing cultural environments, including the building of cities and development of writing, around the Southern Mesopotamia region in South West Iran and border regions of Iraq around the 3100–2900 B.C. The statue is on display at The Metropolitan Museum of Art in the Ancient Near Eastern Art section.

Animals in human postures were common in Proto-Elamite art.

References 

Sculpture of the Ancient Near East
Elam
Silver objects
Depictions of kneeling
Sculptures of the Metropolitan Museum of Art
Metalwork of the Metropolitan Museum of Art
Cattle in art
Ancient art in metal